Bjørn Howard Kruse (born 14 August 1946) is a Norwegian painter and composer. He is also professor of composition at the Norwegian Academy of Music in Oslo.

Personal life
Kruse is the son of Colonel Erling O. Kruse (born 1922, died 2016) and Eunice Cooklin (born 1925, died 2014), and spent his childhood in England and the USA. In 1974 he married Professor Gro Shetelig (born 1948) and they had three girls, singers and actors Benedikte (born 1979), Anine (born 1977) and Jannike Kruse (born 1975). Marriage dissolved 2008. Married Karette Stensæth 2012. Kruse has a broad background as a musician, (clarinet and saxophone), producer and music arranger.

Academic career
Ever since his student days he has given lectures at Norwegian Academy of Music, in jazz theory, arranging as the author of Bruksmusikkarrangering (1978) but foremost in composition, and music and arts ethics.

Bjørn Kruse is a lecturer within his academic area, often based on his book Den Tenkende Kunstner ("The Reflective Artist").

Artistic career
As a composer, he has created more than 150 titles in the genres of chamber music, choral music, larger orchestral works and operas.

In the dance project Memento Mori young and old are joined together in a theatrical tapestry of dance movement, text, voice, music and sound. Kruse and the choreographer Sølvi Edvardsen wanted in this piece to focus on all stages of life.

A key work in Kruse's compositional career is the opera The Green Knight with libretto by Paal-Helge Haugen. It premiered in Kristiansand, Norway, on 10 March 2004. Kruse's latest major work is Chronotope for clarinet and orchestra, premiered on 21 January 2016 with soloist Fredrik Fors, the Oslo Philharmonic Orchestra and conductor Han-Na Chang.

Kruse formed the vocal group Bendik Singers with his brother Philip Kruse and the singers Anne-Karine Strøm and Ellen Nikolaysen.

Selected exhibitions
His latest major exhibitions of paintings were both at the gallery Albin Upp in Oslo: 
 Chaos and Order (2009)
 Space and Time (2010)

Selected works
 Exit (1979)
 Animal (1980)
 Et sjakkspill (1982)
 Metall (1985)
 Nils Holgerson (opera text by S. Lagerlöf) (1986)
 Syntax   (1987)
 Ghirlanda (1988)
 Le voci di sempre (1988)
 Saksofonkonsert (1991)
 Panem et circensis (1993)
 Circum polarum (1994)
 Vindsalme for dei døde (1995)
 Song for Winter (1996)
 På evighetens tavler  (1998)
 Tiden bøyer stenen (1999)
 Iocus : Scherzo for klavertrio (2000)
 Den grøne riddaren : Opera i 2 akter (2004)
 Mene Tekel : For mixed choir and saxophone quartet (2004)
 Eikon : For chamber ensemble (2006)
 Ode to the Sea : For mixed choir a cappella (2007)
 Timaios : For solo alto saxophon and orchestra (2009)
 Devoured : For soprano, violin and piano (2015)
 Chronotope (2016)
 Concerto For Clarinet And Orchestra (2017)

Selected recordings
As musician
 1991: Service for the Nervous – Please Continue Singing (Norway Music Hemera), trio with Warren Carlslstrom & Celio De Carvalho
 1991: In the hall of the mountain king (Crema) The Norwegian Big Band (Radiostorbandet – NRK)

As composer
 1988: Voices – Le voci di sempre
 1993: Cikada – Syntax
 1994: The Operamusical – Adam (Norway Music Hemera)
 1995: Bendik Hofset – Concerto for Saxophone (Aurora Records), album: Orchestral adventures
 1999: Works for Choir – Song For Winter (Aurora Records)
 1999: Concentus – På evighetens tavler (Female choir)
 2016: Portrait With Hidden Face (LabLabel), Eir Inderhaug with Ellen Margrete Flesjø, Ingfrid Breie Nyhus, Gjertrud Pedersen, Ellen Sejersted Bødtker, Eirik Raude, Marianne E. Andersen
 2016: Phonetix, Lars Lien, Berit Solset, Anders Eidsten Dahl LAWO Classics LWC 109
 2016: Havet, speilet i toner, Stavanger Vocalensemble Daniel Engen Productions
 2017: Chronotope, Fredrik Fors, Oslo Philharmonic Orchestra, Christian Eggen LAWO Classics LWC 1129

Bibliography
 Bruksmusikkarrangering 1978
 JAZZTEORI – Grunnleggende prinsipper 1980
 Den tenkende kunstner. Komposisjon og dramaturgi som prosess og metode 1995

Notes

References

External links
Biography – Store Norske Leksikon

20th-century Norwegian composers
21st-century Norwegian composers
20th-century Norwegian male singers
20th-century Norwegian singers
20th-century Norwegian saxophonists
21st-century Norwegian saxophonists
20th-century Norwegian painters
21st-century Norwegian painters
Norwegian male painters
Norwegian male writers
Eurovision Song Contest entrants for Norway
Eurovision Song Contest entrants of 1973
Melodi Grand Prix winners
1946 births
Living people
Norwegian male singers
Musicians from Oslo
Academic staff of the Norwegian Academy of Music
Norwegian Academy of Music alumni
20th-century saxophonists
20th-century Norwegian male artists
21st-century Norwegian male artists